Elias de Barjols (fl. 1191–1230) was a bourgeois Aquitainian troubadour who established himself in Provence and retired a monk. Eleven of his lyrics survive, but none of his music.

According to his vida Elias was the son of a merchant and  came from Agenais. According to his  he was the greatest singer of his age (but such a statement is very frequent in the ') and he travelled widely from court to court as a jongleur with a fellow jongleur named Oliver. They eventually found favour with Alfonso II of Provence: a document dated to 1208 seems to confirm this. Alfonso gave them wives and land in Barjols, where Elias is witness in a document of Ramon Berenguer IV, count of Provence (Alfonso's son) in 1222.

According to his  Elias fell in love with (i. e. celebrated) Garsenda of Sabran, the widow of Alfonso II (died 1209), and composed songs for her "as long as she lived", but none of his songs names her explicitly, whereas three of them are dedicated to Beatrice of Savoy, wife of Ramon Berenguer IV, count of Provence.  The  is therefore inaccurate in this case.

He later entered a hospital of the  founded by Beneic in Avignon, where he died.

Elias was a practitioner of the  style.

Another poem, written probably around 1225, has two  referring to Beatrice of Savoy, husband of Ramon Berenguer IV of Provence, and the lord Blacatz respectively. The stanza preceding them is full of praise for the Emperor Frederick II, suzerain of Provence, who had good relations with both Raymond Berengar and Blacatz at the time. 

Besides Beatrice and Blacatz, Elias wrote poems to Jaufre Reforzat de Trets and Ferdinand III of Castile-León.

Notes

Sources

Egan, Margarita, ed. and trans. The Vidas of the Troubadours. New York: Garland, 1984. .
Gaunt, Simon, and Kay, Sarah (edd.) The Troubadours: An Introduction. Cambridge: Cambridge University Press, 1999. .
Harvey, Ruth. "Courtly culture in medieval Occitania" (pp. 8–27). The Troubadours: An Introduction. Simon Gaunt and Sarah Kay, edd. Cambridge: Cambridge University Press, 1999. .
Stronski, Stanislas, ed. Le Troubadour Elias de Barjols. Toulouse: Edouard Privat, 1906.
Topsfield, L. T. "Raimon de Miraval and the Art of Courtly Love." The Modern Language Review, 51:1 (January 1956), pp. 33–41.

External links

"One should with one's good lord" at Epistolæ: Medieval Women's Latin Letters.

12th-century French troubadours
12th-century births
13th-century deaths
13th-century French troubadours
People from Aquitaine